A reconnaissance vehicle, also known as a scout vehicle, is a military vehicle used for forward reconnaissance. Both tracked and wheeled reconnaissance vehicles are in service. In some nations, light tanks such as the M551 Sheridan and AMX-13 have also been used by scout platoons.  Their armament ranges from a medium machine gun to a large cannon. Modern examples are often fitted with ATGMs and a wide range of sensors.

Reconnaissance vehicles are designed with several philosophies: scout cars used for passive reconnaissance, with a low profile or small size and are lightly armoured to maximize mobility, relying on speed, stealth and cover to escape detection; armoured reconnaissance used for active reconnaissance, distinct from ordinary scouts in weight and size of weapons and armor, designed not to break away from attacks, but to force their way through towards their objective."

Design
Smaller caliber weapons help reduce the vehicle's profile and noise signatures. In contrast, French, and British doctrine was to fit reconnaissance vehicles, such as the AEC, EBR and the AMX 10 RC, with the heaviest weaponry possible on their light chassis, so as to allow them a further role for defence of the flanks. Some vehicles are designed for special data collection tasks (Sd.Kfz. 250/12) Thus reconnaissance vehicles can be divided into 3 main categories: 

 Scout cars: Their main role is surveying the routes (directions of attack) and monitoring the activities of the enemy. Therefore, their weapons and armor are modest, since they are not designed to fight, but this role requires good observation, high speed and they are typically amphibious. Typical examples: Fennek, BRDM, Sd. Kfz. 221, Dingo, BA-64, Csaba.
 Combat reconnaissance vehicles: Heavier wheeled or tracked vehicles armed with autocannons and/or low pressure guns, some with thicker armor (up to 40 mm), for aggressive reconnaissance and to provide fire support for reconnaissance teams. Many are amphibious in order to be able to follow lighter units. Cold war and modern "light tanks" usually fit into this category but they often perform different tasks too. Typical examples: Scimitar & Scorpion, Saladin, Luchs, AML, BRM–1, M3, PT-76, AEC, BA-3, Sd. Kfz. 234/2.
 Intelligence vehicle: These (usually wheeled) units monitor enemy communications, artillery fire, or movements via electro-optics, electronic sensors or radar. They mainly provide information for strategic level decision making. At a tactical level, counter-battery operations and some kinds of precision strikes rely on data gathered by such platforms. Typical examples: Sd.Kfz. 250/12, YPR-765 PRRDR, 1V152, Infauna, M1015, Przebiśnieg, Samarkand. This category may include NBC reconnaissance cars (BRDM-2RKh, TPz 1A3/ABC), certain PsyOps vehicles (ZS-82) and electronic recon vehicles of engineer units (IRM) because of their strategic role.

Recon units sometimes also use other types of vehicles and some are mistakenly classified as recon vehicles. Reconnaissance troops use various all-terrain vehicles (MB, UAZ, HMMWV), motorcycles (Zündapp), militarized trucks known as "technicals" (Toyota), APCs (M113, BTR-40, BTR-80), self-propelled artillery (M106), and even tank destroyers (B1) but these are still classified according to their original type and role, not as scout vehicles.

History
During World War II, the British generally used armoured cars for reconnaissance, from the machine gun armed Humber Light Reconnaissance Car and Daimler Dingo to the 6-pdr (57 mm) gun equipped AEC Armoured Car. Post war the British Army used the Ferret and later, Fox scout cars. In Japan, the Kurogane Type 95 was introduced as a reconnaissance vehicle for operations in China.

The U.S. and UK experimented with the Future Scout and Cavalry System (FSCS) and Tactical Reconnaissance Armoured Combat Equipment Requirement (TRACER) programs in the 2000s aimed at creating a stealth reconnaissance vehicle capable of C-130 airlift.

Prior to the 2003 invasion of Iraq, the Iraqi Army placed an emphasis on the use of light wheeled vehicles for reconnaissance, particularly Soviet-manufactured BRDM-2 and French-designed Panhard AML armoured cars. Each corps had an attached BRDM or AML battalion. These were allocated by division; every brigade headquarters and regular infantry battalion received a platoon of six. The Iraqis did not make competent use of these assets during the Gulf War, opting to depend on signals intelligence against the comparatively sophisticated Coalition.

South African expeditionary forces in Angola also employed wheeled reconnaissance vehicles for their strategic and tactical mobility, sometimes engaging Angolan units up to brigade strength. Scout cars such as the Eland Mk7 were used to lure hostile T-34s or T-54/55s into prepared ambushes, where they were destroyed by heavier vehicles, ATGMs, and artillery.

Role
Reconnaissance by fire. Reconnaissance of enemy positions can involve firing upon the enemy in hopes of receiving return fire that gives away the enemy's position. This can make the reconnaissance vehicle vulnerable to return fire that may destroy the vehicle before the enemy's position can be relayed.

Dismounted operations by armed scouts include observation post manning, reconnaissance of areas not traversable by vehicle, and marking enemy mine fields.

CBRN reconnaissance vehicles can also detect weapons of mass destruction. They accompany regular reconnaissance vehicles and are fully protected against airborne threats.

List of contemporary reconnaissance vehicles

  Alvis FV601 Saladin
  AMX-10 RC
  ASLAV
  BOV M11
  BRDM-1
  BRDM-2
  Cadillac Gage Commando Scout
  Coyote
  Lynx
  TAPV
  D-442 FÚG
  Dozor-B
  EBRC Jaguar
  EE-3 Jararaca
  EE-9 Cascavel
  Eland
 / Fennek
  FV702 Ferret
  FV722 Fox
  FV101 Scorpion
  FV102 Striker
  FV107 Scimitar
  Sabre
  Gagamba
  Type 87 ARV
  LAV-25 Armored Reconnaissance Vehicle
  M1127
  M3 Cavalry Fighting Vehicle
  Mowag Eagle
  Mowag Spy
  Otokar Akrep
  Otokar Cobra I & II
  Katmerciler Hızır Ateş variant
  FNSS Pars 8x8 Scout
  Panhard AML
  Panhard ERC 90
  Panhard VBL
  RBY MK 1
  RG-35 4x4 RPU
  Rooikat
  Schützenpanzer SPz 11-2 Kurz
  Spähpanzer Luchs
  Namco Tiger
  VEC-M1
  VBC-90
  Wiesel
  XAV
  Mildef Rentaka 4x4

See also
Scout car

References

 
Vehicles
Military vehicles by type